The Time is the 1981 debut album by the Time. The album was largely produced and arranged by Prince, credited as Jamie Starr. Three singles came from the album: "Get It Up", "Cool" and "Girl", with the first two charting within the top ten on the R&B charts.

Recording
Although the individual members of the Time are credited with playing their instruments, the music was almost entirely performed by Prince.  The only instrumental performance not by Prince was by Doctor Fink, who played synth on "Cool".  Morris Day sang lead vocals, replacing Prince's guide vocals.

The credits list the recording studio as the fictional "Time Studio", but recording took place in Prince's Kiowa Trail Home Studio, Chanhassen, Minnesota, during April 1981.  "Oh, Baby" had originally been recorded during the Prince album sessions from late April to 13 June 1979, at Alpha Studios, Burbank, California, but the version on the album is from the April 1981, sessions.

Commercial performance
The album peaked at number 50 on the Billboard 200 and number seven on the Top Soul LPs charts. The album spent a total of 32 weeks on the Billboard 200 and 45 weeks on the R&B Albums chart. The album was eventually certified gold by the Recording Industry Association of America (RIAA) for sales of over 500,000 copies in the United States.

Track listing
The original LP and singles gave no writer credits, only stating that "All Jams Published by Tionna Music".  However, all compositions were registered with ASCAP, and the writer credits are derived from that source.

Personnel
Morris Day - lead vocals, background vocals, drums on "Girl", "Cool", "Oh, Baby" and "The Stick"
Prince - all background vocals and instruments, except where noted, engineer, mixing (uncredited)
Dr. Fink - synths on "Get It Up" and "The Stick"
Lisa Coleman - background vocals on "Cool" and "The Stick" (listed as "various girlfriends")
Sue Ann Carwell - background vocals on "Get It Up" and "Cool" (listed as "various girlfriends")
Bernie Grundman - mastering
Al Beaulieu - photography
The album was mixed at Hollywood Sound Recorders, Los Angeles, California, April 1981

Singles and chart placings
"Get It Up" (number 6 R&B)
"Get It Up" (Edit)
"After Hi School"

"Cool" (number 7 R&B, number 90 Pop)
"Cool" (Edit)
"Cool" (Part 2)

"Girl" (number 49 R&B)
"Girl" (Edit)
"The Stick" (Edit)

Charts

Certifications

References

External links
The Time lyrics
"The Time" at discogs

The Time (band) albums
1981 debut albums
Albums produced by Prince (musician)
Warner Records albums
Albums recorded in a home studio